Ernesto "Ernie" Fernández (born 8 June 1960) is a former professional tennis player from Puerto Rico.

Career
The Puerto Rican played collegiate tennis at the Ohio State University and was the singles champion of the Big Ten Conference in 1979, 1981 and 1982, just the third player in history to be a triple winner. He was also a dual NCAA All-American, in 1980 and 1981.  
 
In the 1981 US Open, his only appearance in the singles draw at a Grand Slam, Fernández was beaten in the first round by Gilles Moretton, but managed to take the match to a fifth set. His best performances on the Grand Prix tennis circuit included reaching the quarter-finals at Cleveland in 1981 and wins over both Mike Bauer and Vitas Gerulaitis in the 1984 Congoleum Classic.

Fernández was most prominent on the doubles tour and reached two Grand Prix finals. With Gary Donnelly, Fernández was runner-up at Forest Hills in 1984 and later that year lost another final, in Boston, partnering David Pate. He teamed up with Ricardo Acuña to reach the third round of the 1985 US Open, which was the furthest he would go in a Grand Slam.

Puerto Rico didn't start competing in the Davis Cup tennis until 1992, six years after Fernández last appeared on tour. However, in 1997, he came out of retirement and spent two years playing for the Puerto Rico Davis Cup team. He took part in five ties and played eight rubbers, of which he won three.

Grand Prix career finals

Doubles: 2 (0–2)

Challenger titles

Doubles: (1)

References

1960 births
Living people
Puerto Rican male tennis players
People from Santurce, Puerto Rico
Tennis players at the 1979 Pan American Games
Pan American Games medalists in tennis
Pan American Games bronze medalists for Puerto Rico
Ohio State Buckeyes men's tennis players